Kenneth Hopkins is an American Republican politician, former Rhode Island councilman, and current mayor of Cranston, Rhode Island.

Early career 

Hopkins attended Johnston High School. He played basketball and baseball, receiving All-Division honors in the latter. He then attended Rhode Island Community College from 1974 to 1976. He was as the baseball team's starting pitcher, earning an 8–2 record and setting a single-season record with a .29 ERA. He then transferred to Rhode Island College, finishing with a 7–2 record with three saves and a 3.22 ERA in 78-1/3 innings pitched as an Anchorman.

Hopkins graduated from Rhode Island College in 1978. He then accepted a position at Our Lady of Providence High School, where he served as an assistant coach for the basketball and baseball team while also teaching history. He then taught at Cranston High School East for over a decade. He also coached for La Salle Academy and Johnston High School.

Hopkins left to coach baseball at the Community College of Rhode Island in 1981 as a pitching coach. He was promoted to interim head coach two years later, leading the team to a 20–7 record. He compiled a 68-62-2 record from 1985 to 1989. He then briefly retired from baseball until 2001. During his hiatus, Hopkins served as director of athletics for Cranston Public Schools.

He came out of retirement and proceeded to win four NJCAA Region XXI (New England) Division II championships and Coach of the Year awards in 2001, 2002, 2009 and 2012. He also led the team to a trip to the NJCAA Division II World Series. He also served as a teacher at Cranston East until his election to the city council in 2016.

Political career 

He served as a city councilman after taking office in fall 2016.

In 2020, Hopkins faced Council President Michael Farina in a GOP primary. He was endorsed by incumbent mayor Allan Fung. He faced Democratic candidate Maria A. Bucci, a former councilwoman, in the general election. Hopkins won approximately 54% of the vote in the general election.

In 2022, he announced he was exploring a run for governor of Rhode Island in the 2022 Rhode Island gubernatorial election.

Personal life 

His late wife Mary died of cancer in December 2019.

References

Rhode Island Republicans
Living people
Year of birth missing (living people)
Rhode Island College alumni
Rhode Island city council members
Mayors of Cranston, Rhode Island